The Katy Independent School District (KISD) is a public school district based in Katy, Texas, United States with an enrollment of over 85,700 students. As of August 2009, the district was rated as "Recognized" by the Texas Education Agency.

The district serves  in parts of Harris County, Fort Bend County and Waller County. Most of the district lies within the boundaries of the City of Houston, the City of Katy or their municipalities' extraterritorial jurisdiction (ETJ). Unincorporated areas in Katy ISD include Barker, Cinco Ranch, and Cimarron.

All residential areas of the district are assigned to an elementary school, a junior high school, and a high school by subdivision.

History
During the 2004–2005 school year Katy ISD began a new and revolutionary program in the history of the district, with the use of random drug testing for all individuals involved in UIL competitive organizations, student leaders of any official school clubs, and anyone wishing to park on campus. This caused much controversy prior to its instatement. Many parents complained to the school district, citing the new policy as the violation of individual rights. The district responded to this by having every student who wished to participate in the said activities sign a waiver granting the school district to test them randomly.  This matter had already been settled by the Supreme Court of the United States as constitutional before KISD chose to implement it. In 2019, Katy ISD celebrated 100 years since being founded.

In 2015 two sections of Thornwood, two and three, currently served by KISD, proposed being removed from KISD and placed in the Spring Branch Independent School District, but both KISD and SBISD's boards denied the proposal.

Controversy

Lance Hindt
Lance Hindt, who served as the district's superintendent from 2016 to 2018, was an alumnus of Katy Taylor High School, and in 2012 plagiarized a PhD thesis for the University of Houston (UH).

During a school board meeting in March 2018, an individual named Greg Gay (also known as Greg Barrett) spoke during a public forum segment of the meeting, and accused Hindt of shoving his head in a urinal when they were both enrolled in a secondary school within the district, and said the incident drove him to the brink of suicide. Hindt denied Gay's allegations, claiming he will only be judged by God.

Following the incident, Alabama judge David Carpenter also accused Hindt of bullying during their secondary school years. While Carpenter said that he was not a victim of Hindt's bullying, he has witnessed "frightening, intense and near constant" bullying of weaker classmates by Hindt. Carpenter even labeled Hindt a "thug".

Prior to the incidents' surfacing, Hindt was noted to have taken very public stance against bullying.

At around the same time, a man named Sean Dolan ran Hindt's dissertation through a software, and discovered that it matched with another paper, leading to accusations of plagiarism. The University of Houston administration stated that it would investigate the matter.

After an 18-month investigation, the University of Houston removed Hindt's dissertation from their official website. In May 2018, Hindt announced his resignation and retirement effective January 1, 2019, saying that he cannot fulfill his duties as superintendent and that he had done "dumb things". The district agreed to pay $955,795 as severance; a payment which violated Texas Education Code Section 11.201 and resulted in a loss of $513,755 in funding.

To pursue any defamation claims on behalf of Hindt, the district hired the law firm Feldman and Feldman.

Hindt would later campaign for the KISD board members who had defended him and arranged his huge severance bonus.

The district has been criticized for its perceived inaction on Hindt's plagiarism allegations, which critics say run afoul of the district's responsibility to provide an ethical education to its students. The district's decision to retain a law firm for possible defamation lawsuits was also criticized as possibly an act of bullying in and of itself by the district against its critics, or even an attempt by a taxpayer-funded entity to silence those who were thinking about criticizing a public official.

Intellectual censorship 
In October 2021, author Jerry Craft was scheduled to speak to fourth and fifth graders about his graphic novels New Kid and Class Act. Parents in the district claimed the books taught Critical race theory and started an online petition, prompting the district to cancel the author visit and remove the book from school libraries. Craft was later invited again for a visit to the district, and the books were reinstated in libraries with a restricted audience.

During a school board meeting in November 2021, Seven Lakes High School senior and student activist Cameron Samuels spoke during a public forum segment of the meeting to claim the district was blocking student internet access to the Trevor Project and other websites supporting the LGBTQ+ community. Students, including Samuels, started a petition soon after that garnered almost two thousand signatures within a few months and drew national attention to the district.

The district defended blocking access to the Trevor Project by claiming it violated the Children's Internet Protection Act with its chat features. In December 2021 and January 2022, following formal complaints by Samuels, the district unblocked the websites of four organizations supporting the LGBTQ+ community: the Montrose Center, the Human Rights Campaign, PFLAG, and GLSEN. The filter was eventually brought down after a complaint and letter delivered by the ACLU of Texas on behalf of Samuels.

In February 2022, NBC senior investigative reporter Mike Hixenbaugh and NBC correspondent Antonia Hylton published a report on books disappearing in record numbers from Texas schools, especially those in Katy ISD. The district's superintendent, Dr. Kenneth Gregorski, sent a parent communication to clarify the district's policy regarding removing books from schools, which includes various methods for parent input.

The Houston Chronicle reported in February 2022 that Samuels and other students planned to distribute challenged books to students during a "FReadom Week" initiative, including Maus by Art Spiegelman and Beloved by Toni Morrison. In response to the distribution of hundreds of books, the district initiated an internal review of Maus. Students and parents spoke against banning Maus during the public forum segment of the March 2022 board meeting, and the district announced its decision later that week to keep the book in middle school libraries.

The ACLU of Texas delivered a letter to school board members and the superintendent in April 2022 claiming that the district's book removals violated the First Amendment, the Texas Constitution, and the district's own policies.

After a district parent filed a criminal complaint against Mike Curato's Flamer in the Jordan High School library, district police temporarily removed the book for an investigation. The book had already been deemed appropriate for high schools by a book review committee in March, and the police concurred.

At the August 2022 board meeting, the board discussed the first read of a proposed EF local policy update. Ten students from the Cinco Ranch High School Gay-Straight Alliance, led by student Logan McLean, spoke in support of adding students to the reconsideration committees for instructional materials. The policy was passed at the next meeting without the inclusion of students or explicit inclusion of librarians in the committees. McLean had planned to hold a book distribution at the start of the 2022-2023 school year with the GSA club, but school administrators claimed that prior review was necessary and confiscated the books.

Schools

High schools

Katy High School (Katy) (Est. 1947)
1997-1998 National Blue Ribbon School
James E. Taylor High School (Unincorporated Harris County) (Est. 1979)
1994-1996 National Blue Ribbon School 
Mayde Creek High School (Unincorporated Harris County) (Est. 1984)
1994-1996 National Blue Ribbon School 
Cinco Ranch High School (Unincorporated Fort Bend County) (Est. 1999)
2008 National Blue Ribbon School
Morton Ranch High School (Unincorporated Harris County) (Est. 2004)
Seven Lakes High School (Unincorporated Fort Bend County) (Est. 2005)
Obra D. Tompkins High School (Unincorporated Fort Bend County) (Est. 2013)
Patricia E. Paetow High School (Unincorporated Harris County) (Est. 2017)
Jordan High School (Fulshear) (Est. 2020)

Note: In addition, Katy ISD  lists under high schools:
Miller Career & Technology Center - Offers students from other campuses specialized career and technology programs as well as core classes.
Raines High School - A project-based learning campus that allows students to earn credits at an accelerated pace.

Junior High schools
Joe M. Adams Junior High School (Fulshear) (Est. 2019)
Rodger and Ellen Beck Junior High School (Unincorporated Fort Bend County) (Est. 1996)
2001-02 National Blue Ribbon School 
Beckendorff Junior High School (Unincorporated Fort Bend County) (Est. 2004)
Cardiff Junior High School (Unincorporated Harris County) (Est. 2008)
Cinco Ranch Junior High School (Unincorporated Fort Bend County) (Est. 2001)
Bill & Cindy Haskett Junior High School (Unincorporated Harris County) (Est. 2021)
Katy Junior High School (Katy) (Est. 1965 next to Katy High School, present location 1995)
Mayde Creek Junior High School (Unincorporated Harris County) (Est. 1980)
1999-2000 National Blue Ribbon School 
T. H. McDonald Junior High School (Unincorporated Harris County) (Est. 1991)
Garland McMeans Junior High School (Unincorporated Harris County) (Est. 2000)
Memorial Parkway Junior High School (Unincorporated Harris County) (Est. 1982)
1999-2000 National Blue Ribbon School 
Morton Ranch Junior High School (Unincorporated Harris County) (Est. 2003)
Seven Lakes Junior High School (Unincorporated Fort Bend County) (Est. 2012)
Stockdick Junior High School (Unincorporated Harris County) (Est. 2017)
James and Sharon Tays Junior High School (Unincorporated Fort Bend County) (Est. 2016)
West Memorial Junior High School (Unincorporated Harris County) (Est. 1976)
Woodcreek Junior High School (Katy) (Est. 2008)

Elementary schools
Roosevelt Alexander Elementary School (Uninc. Fort Bend County) (Est. 1998)
Bear Creek Elementary School (Uninc. Harris County) (Est. 1978)
1987-88 National Blue Ribbon School 
Catherine Bethke Elementary School (Uninc. Harris County) (Est. 2016)
Robert and Felice Bryant Elementary School (Uninc. Waller County) (Est. 2017)
Amy Campbell Elementary School (Fulshear) (Est. 2018)
Cimarron Elementary School (Uninc. Harris County) (Est. 1980)
Betty Sue Creech Elementary School (Uninc. Fort Bend County) (Est. 2000)
Creech, flooded during Hurricane Harvey in 2017, and was temporarily closed. The houses of about 75-80% of the students were also damaged in the storm. It reopened in August 2018 after $7 million in renovations.
Keiko Davidson Elementary School (Uninc. Fort Bend County) (Est. 2014)
Jo Ella Exley Elementary School (Uninc. Fort Bend County) (Est. 2004)
Edna Mae Fielder Elementary School (Uninc. Fort Bend County) (Est. 1993)
1998-99 National Blue Ribbon School 
Franz Elementary School (Uninc. Harris County) (Est. 2004)
Loraine T. Golbow Elementary School (Uninc. Harris County) (Est. 1989)
Michael Griffin Elementary School (Uninc. Fort Bend County) (Est. 2006)
Jeanette Hayes Elementary School (Uninc. Harris County) (Est. 1995)
Bonnie Holland Elementary School (Uninc. Fort Bend County) (Est. 2008)
Zelma Hutsell Elementary School (Katy) (Est. 1978)
2000-01 National Blue Ribbon School 
MayDell Jenks Elementary School (Uninc. Fort Bend County) (Est. 2016)
Katy Elementary School (Katy) (Est. 1951, present location 1965)
2006 National Blue Ribbon School 
Kilpatrick Elementary School (Uninc. Fort Bend County) (Est. 2003)
Robert E. King Elementary School (Uninc. Harris County) (Est. 2001)
Olga Leonard Elementary School (Uninc. Harris County) (Est. 2019)
Mayde Creek Elementary School (Uninc. Harris County) (Est. 1983)
National Blue Ribbon School in 1989-90 and 2000-01 
Peter McElwain Elementary School (Uninc. Harris County) (Est. 2020)
Polly Ann McRoberts Elementary School (Uninc. Harris County) (Est. 1997)
Memorial Parkway Elementary School (Uninc. Harris County) (Est. 1978)
1998-99 National Blue Ribbon School 
Morton Ranch Elementary School (Uninc. Harris County) (Est. 2008)
Nottingham Country Elementary School (Uninc. Harris County) (Est. 1981)
Hazel S. Pattison Elementary School (Uninc. Harris County) (Est. 1989)
1993-94 National Blue Ribbon School 
James E. Randolph Elementary School (Fulshear) (Est. 2014)
Rhoads Elementary School (Uninc. Harris County) (Est. 2004)
Robertson Elementary School (Uninc. Harris County) (Est. 2022)
Rylander Elementary School (Uninc. Fort Bend County) (Est. 2004)
Betty and Jean Schmalz Elementary School (Uninc. Harris County) (Est. 2001)
Fred and Patti Shafer Elementary School (Uninc. Fort Bend County) (Est. 2012)
Stan Stanley Elementary School (Uninc. Harris County) (Est. 2009)
Stephens Elementary School (Uninc. Harris County) (Est. 2007)
Sundown Elementary School (Uninc. Harris County) (Est. 1982)
West Memorial Elementary School (Uninc. Harris County) (Est. 1974)
James E. Williams Elementary School (Uninc. Fort Bend County) (Est. 2000)
Tom Wilson Elementary School (Uninc. Fort Bend County) (Est. 2012)
Diane Winborn Elementary School (Uninc. Harris County) (Est. 1981)
Maurice L. Wolfe Elementary School (Houston) (Est. 2012)
1998-99 National Blue Ribbon School 
Ray and Jamie Wolman Elementary School (''Uninc. Fort Bend County) (Est. 2012)
WoodCreek Elementary School (Katy) (Est. 2007)

Support Facilities
Administration Building
Leonard E. Merrell Center
Rhodes Stadium
Transportation Center (East) (adjacent to Mayde Creek High School)
Transportation Center (West) (adjacent to Katy Junior High School)
Transportation Center (South) (adjacent to Rylander Elementary School)
Gerald Young Agricultural Science Center
L. D. Robinson Pavilion & Rodeo Arena
Katy ISD Law Enforcement Center (adjacent to Morton Ranch High School)
Katy ISD Storage Annex (Danover Street, former Kilpatrick Elementary)
Legacy Stadium

Other Campuses
Katy ISD Virtual School
Opportunity Awareness Center
Robert R. Shaw Center for STEAM
Simon Youth Academy

Katy ISD has done an extensive study and maintains and updates a District Growth and Facilities Planning Study.

Departments
The Katy ISD Police Department was created in 1989 because the district had jurisdictional issues and low response times from other police agencies.

See also

List of school districts in Texas
List of schools in Harris County, Texas
Bill Callegari, KISD trustee from 1984 to 1988; member of the Texas House of Representatives from Katy, 2001-2015

References

External links

 

 
School districts in Houston
School districts in Fort Bend County, Texas
School districts in Harris County, Texas
School districts in Waller County, Texas